Doaa Elghobashy (born November 8, 1996) is an Egyptian beach volleyball player.

Career 
Elghobashy competed in the 2016 Summer Olympics in Rio de Janeiro alongside Nada Meawad in the beach volleyball competition. She and Meawad qualified for the Games by winning the CAVB Continental Cup held in Nigeria.

The team turned heads in their first match against Germany as the team wore long sleeves and pants and Elghobashy wearing a hijab—an Olympic first in beach volleyball. The team was also Egypt's first ever Olympic team to compete in a beach volleyball tournament. Though Elghobashy and Meawad did not advance in the tournament, Elghobashy has become an inspiration for Muslim women, especially those in sports and who wear a headscarf, as she joined the ranks of the few Muslim women who compete in a headscarf.

Elghobashy has worn a hijab for 10 years and it has always been a part of her beach volleyball career. She was allowed to wear it in the Games after the international volleyball federation relaxed uniform regulations before the 2012 Summer Olympics in London.

See also 
 Muslim women in sport

References 

1996 births
Living people
Beach volleyball players at the 2016 Summer Olympics
Olympic Egyptian women's beach volleyball players
Competitors at the 2019 African Games
African Games competitors for Egypt
People from Beheira Governorate
21st-century Egyptian women